In mathematical analysis, a domain or region is a non-empty connected open set in a topological space, in particular any non-empty connected open subset of the real coordinate space  or the complex coordinate space . A connected open subset of coordinate space is frequently used for the domain of a function, but in general, functions may be defined on sets that are not topological spaces.

The basic idea of a connected subset of a space dates from the 19th century, but precise definitions vary slightly from generation to generation, author to author, and edition to edition, as concepts developed and terms were translated between German, French, and English works. In English, some authors use the term domain, some use the term region, some use both terms interchangeably, and some define the two terms slightly differently; some avoid ambiguity by sticking with a phrase such as non-empty connected open subset.

Conventions
One common convention is to define a domain as a connected open set but a region as the union of a domain with none, some, or all of its limit points. A closed region or closed domain is the union of a domain and all of its limit points.

Various degrees of smoothness of the boundary of the domain are required for various properties of functions defined on the domain to hold, such as integral theorems (Green's theorem, Stokes theorem), properties of Sobolev spaces, and to define measures on the boundary and spaces of traces (generalized functions defined on the boundary). Commonly considered types of domains are domains with continuous boundary, Lipschitz boundary,  boundary, and so forth.

A bounded domain is a domain which is a bounded set, while an exterior or external domain is the interior of the complement of a bounded domain.

In complex analysis, a complex domain (or simply domain) is any connected open subset of the complex plane . For example, the entire complex plane is a domain, as is the open unit disk, the open upper half-plane, and so forth. Often, a complex domain serves as the domain of definition for a holomorphic function.

Historical notes

According to Hans Hahn, the concept of a domain as an open connected set was introduced by Constantin Carathéodory in his famous book . 
In this definition, Carathéodory considers obviously non-empty disjoint sets.
Hahn also remarks that the word "Gebiet" ("Domain") was occasionally previously used as a synonym of open set.  The rough concept is older. In the 19th and early 20th century, the terms domain and region were often used informally (sometimes interchangeably) without explicit definition.

However, the term "domain" was occasionally used to identify closely related but slightly different concepts. For example, in his influential monographs on elliptic partial differential equations, Carlo Miranda uses the term "region" to identify an open connected set, and reserves the term "domain" to identify an internally connected, perfect set, each point of which is an accumulation point of interior points, following his former master Mauro Picone: according to this convention, if a set  is a region then its closure  is a domain.

See also

Notes

References 
 
 
  Reprinted 1968 (Chelsea).
  English translation of 
 
 
 
 
 
  English translation of  
 
 
 
 
 
  Translated as 
 
 
 
  English translation of 
 
   

Mathematical analysis
Partial differential equations
Topology